The  is a free national expressway in the Japanese prefecture of Ishikawa. As of July 2019, it connects the town Uchinada to the town Wajima, spanning nearly the entire Noto Peninsula from south to north. Much of the northern portion of the road runs concurrently with the Nōetsu Expressway. It is owned and operated by Ministry of Land, Infrastructure, Transport and Tourism (MLIT) and is signed as E41 and E86 under their "2016 Proposal for Realization of Expressway Numbering."

History

The Noto-Satoyama Kaidō was first opened as the tolled  between Takamatsu and Yanaida interchanges on 21 July 1973 by the Ishikawa Prefecture Toll Road Corporation. In August of the same year it was extended south to Shiroo Interchange.

The Noto Toll Road was damaged by the 2007 Noto earthquake, a magnitude 6.9 earthquake that closed sections of the road for six months.

The toll road was released from the Ishikawa Prefecture Toll Road Corporation on 1 April 2013 and all tolls were removed. When MLIT took control of the highway after its release by the Ishikawa Prefecture Toll Road Corporation, it was given its current name, the Noto-Satoyama Kaidō.

Junction list
The entire expressway is in Ishikawa Prefecture. Exits are not numbered. PA= Parking area, SA= Service area 
|colspan="8" style="text-align: center;"|Through to Ishikawa Prefecture Route 60

References

Expressways in Japan
Roads in Ishikawa Prefecture